Yes and Also Yes is Mike Doughty's fourth proper studio album, released in 2011. The album was released under Doughty's label SNACK BAR, and through Megaforce Records. Doughty left his previous label, ATO Records, so he could have more control over his shop and business.

Track listing

External links 

2011 albums
Mike Doughty albums
ATO Records albums
Albums produced by Pat Dillett